From the Screen to Your Stereo is an EP by New Found Glory (formerly A New Found Glory) released on 28 March 2000 by Drive-Thru Records. All the tracks are covers of songs from motion picture soundtracks. The album was pressed on 10" vinyl and released in three different colors: light marble blue, marble red, and white. The vinyl pressing featured a bonus track.  In 2002, the album was released on a non-US split with the Japanese band Nicotine entitled Movie Addiction, on which Nicotine also covered songs from movies. In 2007 the band released a follow up, this time a full-length album titled From the Screen to Your Stereo Part II.

Track listing

Personnel
Jordan Pundik - lead vocals
Chad Gilbert - lead guitar, vocals
Steve Klein - rhythm guitar
Ian Grushka - bass guitar
Cyrus Bolooki - drums, percussion

References

External links

From the Screen to Your Stereo at YouTube (streamed copy where licensed)

New Found Glory EPs
Covers EPs
2000 EPs
Drive-Thru Records EPs
Albums produced by Chad Gilbert
Albums produced by Jeremy Staska

it:Tip of the Iceberg